The Ransom EP is the debut EP by American rock band Cartel. The recording was originally released independently, but was soon picked up by the record label, The Militia Group. They re-released the EP with two extra tracks, "The City Never Sleeps" and "Fiend".

Track listing

Credits
Will Pugh - vocals
Kevin Sanders - drums
Joseph Pepper - Guitar
Andrew Lee - Guitar
Ryan Roberts - Bass guitar
John Addington - Gang Vocals on Luckie St.
Luke Bareis - Gang Vocals on Luckie St.
Gang Vocals on Luckie St. also performed by Cartel

References

External links

The Ransom EP at YouTube (streamed copy where licensed)
Acclaimed Punk review of The Ransom EP

2004 debut EPs
Cartel (band) albums